Michele Brooks is a Republican member of the Pennsylvania State Senate for the 50th District. Prior to her election to the State Senate in 2014, she served as a member of Pennsylvania House of Representatives for the 17th District and was elected in 2006. In June 2006, Brooks was selected by the local Republican committee to replace the retiring 10-year incumbent Rod Wilt on the ballot.

Prior to her election, she served as a member of the Mercer County Commissioners. She also was a member of the Jamestown Borough Council from 1996 through 2002.

Personal
Brooks graduated from the Anne Anstine Excellence in Public Services Series. Her professional experience includes being the co-founder and Vice President of Jamestown Future Foundation.

References

External links
Pennsylvania House of Representatives - Michele Brooks official PA House website
Pennsylvania House Republican Caucus - Representative Michele Brooks official Party website

Republican Party Pennsylvania state senators
Republican Party members of the Pennsylvania House of Representatives
Living people
Women state legislators in Pennsylvania
21st-century American politicians
21st-century American women politicians
Year of birth missing (living people)

Mercer County Commissioners (Pennsylvania)